Jorge Johan Vásquez Rosales (born 8 October 1984 in Lima, Peru) is former a Peruvian footballer who played as a centre midfielder for Cienciano and other teams in the Peruvian First Division.

Club career
In January 2012, Vásquez had his contract with Universitario de Deportes rescinded by the Peruvian Football Federation due to 7 months of unpaid wages. He joined León de Huánuco for the start of the 2012 Torneo Descentralizado season.

Honours

Club
Universitario de Deportes
 Torneo Descentralizado: 2009

References

External links
 
 

1984 births
Living people
Footballers from Lima
Association football midfielders
Peruvian footballers
Peru international footballers
Coronel Bolognesi footballers
Club Universitario de Deportes footballers
León de Huánuco footballers
Cienciano footballers
FBC Melgar footballers
Peruvian Primera División players